Jim Croce Live: The Final Tour is a live album by American singer-songwriter Jim Croce, originally released in 1989, roughly 16 years after his untimely death at age 30 in a plane crash on September 20, 1973. Recorded on the 1973 tour, the album features in-concert performances of some of Croce's biggest hits, peppered with stories and banter between songs, adding the inspiration for some of them. Two other songs, "Ball of Kerrymuir" and "Shopping for Clothes," were never released on Croce's studio albums. This live album has been re-released several times.

Track listing

Personnel
Jim Croce – guitar, vocals
Maury Muehleisen  – guitar, vocals

Jim Croce albums
Live albums published posthumously
1980 live albums